The 1946 Minnesota Golden Gophers football team represented the University of Minnesota in the 1946 Big Nine Conference football season. In their 12th year under head coach Bernie Bierman, the Golden Gophers compiled a 5–4 record and outscored their opponents by a combined total of 130 to 114.

Halfback Billy Bye was awarded the team MVP award.

Total attendance for the season was 328,003, which averaged to 54,667. The season high for attendance was against Michigan.

Schedule

Game summaries

Michigan

On November 2, 1946, Minnesota lost to by a score of 21 to 0. In the second quarter, Michigan relied on the passing game in its first touchdown drive, as Bob Chappuis completed a pass for 43 yards to Elmer Madar and Bump Elliott then ran two yards for the touchdown on a fourth-down play. Elliott scored again in the third quarter on a 10-yard run. In the fourth quarter, Gene Derricotte threw a pass to Bob Mann that was good for 42 yards and a touchdown. Jim Brieske kicked all three points after touchdown. Michigan gained 183 rushing yards and 174 passing yards, while holding Minnesota to 130 rushing yards and 40 passing yards.

After the season

The 1947 NFL Draft was held on December 16, 1946. The following Golden Gophers were selected.

References

Minnesota
Minnesota Golden Gophers football seasons
Minnesota Golden Gophers football